"Flowers" is the debut single by UK garage duo Sweet Female Attitude, released on 3 April 2000. The song uses the same chord sequence as Erik Satie's Trois Gymnopédies, and the actual piece can be heard in the version by The House & Garage Orchestra, from the 2018 album Garage Classics.

The song peaked at number two on the UK Singles Chart with first-week sales of about 80,500. It went on to become the United Kingdom's 37th biggest-selling single of 2000 and received a platinum certification from the British Phonographic Industry (BPI) for sales and streams of at least 600,000. The duo's subsequent releases failed to replicate the commercial success of “Flowers”, with the song being described as a "one-hit wonder" for Sweet Female Attitude.

"Flowers" has been sampled and covered several times, most notably by DJ Spoony featuring the Sugababes and by Nathan Dawe featuring Jaykae. The latter version peaked at number 12 on the UK Singles Chart in 2020, also receiving platinum certification from the BPI.

Impact and legacy
Writing for The Guardian in 2019, music critic Alexis Petridis listed the song at number six on retrospective of the best UK garage tracks, describing the track as "utterly charming. Essentially, UK street soul repurposed to fit a new style, Todd Edwards-style vocal cut-ups and all, its chorus was hooky and infectious, its light, summer's-day atmosphere delightful". Also for The Guardian, writer Michael Cragg ranked "Flowers" second in a list of the greatest ever songs of the summer.

Mixmag included "Flowers" in its list of 40 of the best UK garage tracks released from 1995 to 2005. In September 2019, NME included the song in its roundup of the best UK garage anthems list. Capital Xtra included the song in their list of "The Best Old-School Garage Anthems of All Time".

Music video
The music video for "Flowers" was directed by Pete Nilsen and Ryan Davids.

Track listings

UK CD single
 "Flowers" (Sunship edit) – 3:49
 "Flowers" (Supa' Flyas mix) – 3:36
 "Flowers" (Sunship mix) – 5:00
 "Flowers" (Wackside's Tweaker mix) – 7:05

UK 12-inch single
A1. "Flowers" (Sunship mix) – 5:00
A2. "Flowers" (Sunship vs. Chunky featuring Shado Kane) – 6:22
B1. "Flowers" (Wackside's Tweaker mix) – 7:05

UK cassette single
 "Flowers" (Sunship edit) – 3:49
 "Flowers" (Supa' Flyas mix) – 3:36
 "Flowers" (Solomon's Precious mix) – 5:56
 "Flowers" (Sunship vs. Chunky featuring Shado Kane) – 6:22

German maxi-CD single
 "Flowers" (Sunship edit) – 3:49
 "Flowers" (Sunship mix) – 5:00
 "Flowers" (Sunship vs. Chunky featuring Shado Kane) – 6:22
 "Flowers" (Wackside's Tweaker mix) – 7:06
 "Flowers" (Supa'Flyas Viva mix) – 3:34

Australian maxi-CD single
 "Flowers" (C & J Mix) – 3:59
 "Flowers" (Supa'Flyas Viva mix) – 3:36
 "Flowers" (Sunship edit) – 3:50
 "Flowers" (Wackside's Small Tweaker radio) – 3:46
 "Flowers" (Sunship mix) – 5:02
 "Flowers" (Wackside's Tweaker mix) – 7:06
 "Flowers" (Solomon's Precious mix) – 5:57
 "Flowers" (Sunship vs Chunky) – 6:24

Charts

Weekly charts

Year-end charts

Certifications

DJ Spoony version
In 2019, the original members of the Sugababes reformed and recorded "Flowers" for DJ Spoony's Garage Classical album. This version reached No. 22 on the Scottish Singles Chart, No. 26 on the UK Dance Singles Chart and No. 20 on the UK Singles Downloads Chart in October 2019.

Weekly charts

Nathan Dawe version

British DJ and producer Nathan Dawe released a cover version of the song as a single on 25 October 2019 through Atlantic UK. The single gives a featuring credit to rapper Jaykae for his verse, but Dawe chose not to give a featuring credit to Malika Ferguson for her vocals, nor to Sweet Female Attitude. It peaked at number 12 on the UK Singles Chart.

Background
Talking to the Official Charts Company about the success of the song, Dawe said, "It's a surreal feeling. I've been pretty much working my whole music career for this achievement, so now that it's happened, it feels a bit weird. It's not the best time for everyone right now, but it's equally bad for all of us. Although I suppose it's a decent situation for myself!". He also said, "The writers of the original 'Flowers' (Mike Powell and Martin Green) have 100% of all the publishing royalties." Although Dawe re-worked some of the lyrics and added a verse by Jaykae, he insisted that "It's still Powell and Green's song, isn't it? I've seen the odd couple of tweets saying I've just used a cover for my financial gain. I'm not actually making money from the song."

Weekly charts

Year-end charts

Certifications

Other versions and samples
In 2018, a cover version was released by Bastille along with Rationale and James Arthur for the mixtape album Other People's Heartache Pt. 4, and the House & Garage Orchestra together with Sweet Female Attitude recorded an orchestral version for the album Garage Classics. In 2019, AJ Tracey and Jorja Smith performed a cover of the song for BBC Radio 1's Live Lounge.

"Flowers" is sampled in British girl group M.O's 2014 single "Dance On My Own", while British-Jamaican hip hop duo Krept and Konan also sampled the track for their 2018 single "Pour Me Another One". In 2021, London based artist PinkPantheress sampled the track for her single "Pain", and British rapper ArrDee sampled the backing track and chorus of "Flowers" for his single "Flowers (Say My Name)".

References

1999 songs
2000 debut singles
2019 singles
Atlantic Records UK singles
Nathan Dawe songs
Song recordings produced by Cutfather & Joe
Sugababes songs
UK garage songs
Warner Music Group singles